Keren, historically known as Sanhit, is the second-largest city in Eritrea. The city sprawls on a wide basin surrounded by granitic mountains on all sides. It serves as the capital of the Anseba Region, and is home to a number of ethnic groups including the Bilen people, Tigre people and Tigrinya people.

History

Keren grew around the Eritrean Railway to Asmara. The railway was later dismantled because of the war, although there are plans to rebuild it. It is an important commercial centre and was the scene of regular battles in both World War II and the Eritrean War of Independence. Keren was the site of a key battle between Italian and British troops in February – March 1941.

Demographics
As of 2016, Keren has a population of around 120,000 inhabitants. Residents belong to various, mainly Afroasiatic-speaking ethnic groups, of which the Bilen people, Tigre people and Tigrinya people.

Climate
Keren has a hot semi-arid climate (Köppen BSh), with two main seasons. There is a short monsoonal wet season from June to September and a length dry season covering the rest of the year. Vis-à-vis most hot semi-arid climates in northern Africa like those of Niamey or N'Djamena, Keren's climate is much less extreme due to the city's higher altitude. Following the wet season, temperatures remain very warm to hot during the day, but during the mornings become comfortably cool.

Attractions

Attractions in the city include the nineteenth century Tigu fort, the St Maryam Deari chapel, lying in a baobab tree, the 1920s former railway station, the old mosque, Sayed Bakri Mausoleum, British Army and Italian Army cemeteries and local markets. The nearby sixth century Debre Sina monastery is also known for its cave dwellings.

Districts
The town's outlying subregions include:
 Elabered
 Geleb Subregion
 Hagaz (Hagat)
 Halhal
 Melabso

References

Further reading

Hill, Justin (2002), Ciao Asmara, A classic account of contemporary Africa. Little, Brown, . VSO volunteer's story of Eritrea. Hill lived in Keren for two years
The Globalist Feature, including an extract from Justin Hill's book, Ciao Asmara.

 
Anseba Region
Regional capitals in Eritrea
Populated places in Eritrea